Shou Zi Chew (born 1 January 1983) is a Singaporean entrepreneur. He is the CEO of social networking company TikTok.

Chew was born in Singapore and studied at University College London and graduated with a bachelor’s degree in economics in 2006. He received an MBA from Harvard Business School in 2010. 

Chew joined ByteDance, company headquartered in Beijing, as CFO in March 2021. He replaced former CEO Kevin A. Mayer, who left the company after only 3 months in the role as CEO.

References 

1983 births
Living people
21st-century Singaporean businesspeople
People from Singapore
ByteDance people
Alumni of University College London
Harvard Business School alumni
Chief financial officers